The stout rockfish, Acanthoclinus marilynae, is a longfin of the family Plesiopidae, found only in New Zealand's subtidal zone and in rock pools at low tide.  Their length is up to 17 cm. The specific name honours Hardy's wife, Marilyn.

References

Stout rockfish
Endemic marine fish of New Zealand
Fish described in 1985